Penruddock is a small village in Cumbria, England, 5.5 miles to the west of Penrith. It forms part of the civil parish of Hutton.

History
The name Penruddock is Cumbric.  With both red soil and red sandstone in the area to the south, the word Penruddock is likely derived from the word Pen (hill) and a cognate of the Welsh word rhudd (red). Red Hill is also believed to be the translation of the word Penrith and an area called Redhills now lies between the two.

The village of Penruddock itself is situated over limestone which is visible in many places, with craggy outcrops and a limestone pavement on the eastern boundary, and the remains of an ancient lime burning kiln on the north western boundary. The soil over the limestone is a fairly heavy clay which retains water, with the result that it helps keep vegetation alive during times of drought, but creates very wet conditions for long periods during the winter months.

Governance
Penruddock is in the parliamentary constituency of Penrith and the Border. Neil Hudson was elected its Conservative Member of Parliament at the 2019 General Election, replacing Rory Stewart.

Before Brexit, it was in the North West England European Parliamentary Constituency.

Transport

Its railway station on the former Cockermouth, Keswick and Penrith Railway closed in the 1970s and was demolished on 4 March 1997. The closest station is at Penrith.

There is also a bus service that runs between Penrith and Keswick that can be caught outside the Herdwick Inn every hour.

See also

Listed buildings in Hutton, Cumbria

External links

 Cumbria County History Trust: Hutton Soil (nb: provisional research only – see Talk page)
 Article on The Cumbria Directory
The Herdwick Inn
Penruddock Primary School

Villages in Cumbria
Lime kilns in the United Kingdom
Hutton, Cumbria